Iowa is a state in the upper Midwestern region of the United States, bordered by the Mississippi River to the east and the Missouri River and Big Sioux River to the west. It is bordered by six states: Wisconsin to the northeast, Illinois to the east and southeast, Missouri to the south, Nebraska to the west, South Dakota to the northwest, and Minnesota to the north.

During the 18th and early 19th centuries, Iowa was a part of French Louisiana and Spanish Louisiana; its state flag is patterned after the flag of France. After the Louisiana Purchase, people laid the foundation for an agriculture-based economy in the heart of the Corn Belt. In the latter half of the 20th century, Iowa's agricultural economy transitioned to a diversified economy of advanced manufacturing, processing, financial services, information technology, biotechnology, and green energy production.

Iowa is the 26th most extensive in total area and the 31st most populous of the 50 U.S. states, with a population of 3,190,369, according to the 2020 census. The state's capital, most populous city, and largest metropolitan area fully located within the state is Des Moines. A portion of the larger Omaha, Nebraska, metropolitan area extends into three counties of southwest Iowa. Iowa has been listed as one of the safest U.S. states to live in.

Etymology

Iowa derives its name from the Ioway people, a Chiwere-speaking Siouan Nation who were once part of the Ho-Chunk Confederation that inhabited the area now corresponding to several Midwest states. The Ioway were one of the many Native American nations whose territory comprised the future state of Iowa before the time of European colonization.

History

Prehistory

When American Indians first arrived in what is now Iowa more than 13,000 years ago, they were hunters and gatherers living in a Pleistocene glacial landscape. By the time European explorers and traders visited Iowa, American Indians were largely settled farmers with complex economic, social, and political systems. This transformation happened gradually. During the Archaic period (10,500 to 2,800 years ago), American Indians adapted to local environments and ecosystems, slowly becoming more sedentary as populations increased.

More than 3,000 years ago, during the Late Archaic period, American Indians in Iowa began utilizing domesticated plants. The subsequent Woodland period saw an increased reliance on agriculture and social complexity, with increased use of mounds, ceramics, and specialized subsistence. During the Late Prehistoric period (beginning about AD 900) increased use of maize and social changes led to social flourishing and nucleated settlements.

The arrival of European trade goods and diseases in the Protohistoric period led to dramatic population shifts and economic and social upheaval, with the arrival of new tribes and early European explorers and traders. There were numerous Indian tribes living in Iowa at the time of early European exploration. Tribes which were probably descendants of the prehistoric Oneota include the Dakota, Ho-Chunk, Ioway, and Otoe. Tribes which arrived in Iowa in the late prehistoric or protohistoric periods include the Illiniwek, Meskwaki, Omaha, and Sauk.

Early colonization and trade, 1673–1808

The first known European explorers to document Iowa were Jacques Marquette and Louis Jolliet who traveled the Mississippi River in 1673 documenting several Indigenous villages on the Iowa side. The area of Iowa was claimed for France and remained a French territory until 1763. The French, before their impending defeat in the French and Indian War, transferred ownership to their ally, Spain. Spain practiced very loose control over the Iowa region, granting trading licenses to French and British traders, who established trading posts along the Mississippi and Des Moines Rivers.

Iowa was part of a territory known as La Louisiane or Louisiana, and European traders were interested in lead and furs obtained by Indigenous people. The Sauk and Meskwaki effectively controlled trade on the Mississippi in the late 18th century and early 19th century. Among the early traders on the Mississippi were Julien Dubuque, Robert de la Salle, and Paul Marin. Along the Missouri River at least five French and English trading houses were built before 1808. In 1800, Napoleon Bonaparte took control of Louisiana from Spain in a treaty.

After the 1803 Louisiana Purchase, Congress divided the Louisiana Purchase into two parts—the Territory of Orleans and the District of Louisiana, with present-day Iowa falling in the latter. The Indiana Territory was created in 1800 to exercise jurisdiction over this portion of the District; William Henry Harrison was its first governor. Much of Iowa was mapped by Zebulon Pike in 1805, but it was not until the construction of Fort Madison in 1808 that the U.S. established tenuous military control over the region.

War of 1812 and unstable U.S. control

Fort Madison was built to control trade and establish U.S. dominance over the Upper Mississippi, but it was poorly designed and disliked by the Sauk and Fox, many of whom allied with the British, who had not abandoned claims to the territory. Fort Madison was defeated by British-supported Indigenous people in 1813 during the War of 1812, and Fort Shelby in Prairie du Chien, Wisconsin, also fell to the British. Black Hawk took part in the siege of Fort Madison. Another small military outpost was established along the Mississippi River in present-day Bellevue. This poorly situated stockade was similarly attacked by hundreds of Indigenous people in 1813, but was successfully defended and later abandoned until settlers returned to the area in the mid-1830s.

After the war, the U.S. re-established control of the region through the construction of Fort Armstrong, Fort Snelling in Minnesota, and Fort Atkinson in Nebraska.

Indian removal, 1814–1832
The United States encouraged settlement of the east side of the Mississippi and removal of Indians to the west. A disputed 1804 treaty between Quashquame and William Henry Harrison (then governor of the Indiana Territory) that surrendered much of Illinois to the U.S. enraged many Sauk and led to the 1832 Black Hawk War.

The Sauk and Meskwaki sold their land in the Mississippi Valley during 1832 in the Black Hawk Purchase and sold their remaining land in Iowa in 1842, most of them moving to a reservation in Kansas. Many Meskwaki later returned to Iowa and settled near Tama, Iowa; the Meskwaki Settlement remains to this day. In 1856 the Iowa Legislature passed an unprecedented act allowing the Meskawki to purchase the land. However, in contrast to the unprecedented act of the Iowa Legislature, the United States Federal Government, through the use of Treaties, forced the Ho-Chunk from Iowa in 1848, and forced the Dakota from Iowa by 1858. Western Iowa around modern Council Bluffs was used as an Indian Reservation for members of the Council of Three Fires.

U.S. settlement and statehood, 1832–1860

The first American settlers officially moved to Iowa in June 1833. Primarily, they were families from Ohio, Pennsylvania, New York, Indiana, Kentucky, and Virginia who settled along the western banks of the Mississippi River, founding the modern day cities of Dubuque and Bellevue. On July 4, 1838, the U.S. Congress established the Territory of Iowa. President Martin Van Buren appointed Robert Lucas governor of the territory, which at the time had 22 counties and a population of 23,242.

Almost immediately after achieving territorial status, a clamor arose for statehood. On December 28, 1846, Iowa became the 29th state in the Union when President James K. Polk signed Iowa's admission bill into law. Once admitted to the Union, the state's boundary issues resolved, and most of its land purchased from Natives, Iowa set its direction to development and organized campaigns for settlers and investors, boasting the young frontier state's rich farmlands, fine citizens, free and open society, and good government.

Iowa has a long tradition of state and county fairs. The first and second Iowa State Fairs were held in the more developed eastern part of the state at Fairfield. The first fair was held October 25–27, 1854, at a cost of around $323. Thereafter, the fair moved to locations closer to the center of the state and in 1886 found a permanent home in Des Moines. The State Fair has been held annually since then, except for a few exceptions: 1898 due to the Spanish–American War and the World's Fair being held in nearby Omaha, Nebraska; from 1942 to 1945, due to World War II, as the fairgrounds were being used as an army supply depot; and in 2020 due to the COVID-19 pandemic in the United States.

Civil War, 1861–1865

Iowa supported the Union during the Civil War, voting heavily for Abraham Lincoln, though there was an antiwar "Copperhead" movement in the state, caused partially by a drop in crop prices caused by the war. There were no battles in the state, although the Battle of Athens, Missouri, 1861, was fought just across the Des Moines River from Croton, Iowa, and shots from the battle landed in Iowa. Iowa sent large supplies of food to the armies and the eastern cities.

Much of Iowa's support for the Union can be attributed to Samuel J. Kirkwood, its first wartime governor. Of a total population of 675,000, about 116,000 men were subjected to military duty. Iowa contributed proportionately more soldiers to Civil War military service than did any other state, north or south, sending more than 75,000 volunteers to the armed forces, over one-sixth of whom were killed before the Confederates surrendered at Appomattox.

Most fought in the great campaigns in the Mississippi Valley and in the South. Iowa troops fought at Wilson's Creek in Missouri, Pea Ridge in Arkansas, Forts Henry and Donelson, Shiloh, Chattanooga, Chickamauga, Missionary Ridge, and Rossville Gap as well as Vicksburg, Iuka, and Corinth. They served with the Army of the Potomac in Virginia and fought under Union General Philip Sheridan in the Shenandoah Valley. Many died and were buried at Andersonville. They marched on General Nathaniel Banks' ill-starred expedition to the Red River. Twenty-seven Iowans have been awarded the Medal of Honor, the highest military decoration awarded by the United States government, which was first awarded in the Civil War.

Iowa had several brigadier generals and four major generals—Grenville Mellen Dodge, Samuel R. Curtis, Francis J. Herron, and Frederick Steele—and saw many of its generals go on to state and national prominence following the war.

Agricultural expansion, 1865–1930
Following the Civil War, Iowa's population continued to grow dramatically, from 674,913 people in 1860 to 1,624,615 in 1880. The American Civil War briefly brought higher profits.

In 1917, the United States entered World War I and farmers as well as all Iowans experienced a wartime economy. For farmers, the change was significant. Since the beginning of the war in 1914, Iowa farmers had experienced economic prosperity, which lasted until the end of the war. In the economic sector, Iowa also has undergone considerable change. Beginning with the first industries developed in the 1830s, which were mainly for processing materials grown in the area, Iowa has experienced a gradual increase in the number of business and manufacturing operations.

Depression, World War II and manufacturing, 1930–1985

The transition from an agricultural economy to a mixed economy happened slowly. The Great Depression and World War II accelerated the shift away from smallholder farming to larger farms, and began a trend of urbanization. The period after World War II witnessed a particular increase in manufacturing operations.

In 1975, Governor Robert D. Ray petitioned President Ford to allow Iowa to accept and resettle Tai Dam refugees fleeing the Indochina War.  An exception was required for this resettlement as State Dept policy at the time forbid resettlement of large groups of refugees in concentrated communities; an exception was ultimately granted and 1200 Tai Dam were resettled in Iowa.  Since then Iowa has accepted thousands of refugees from Laos, Cambodia, Thailand, Bhutan, and Burma.

The farm crisis of the 1980s caused a major recession in Iowa, causing poverty not seen since the Depression. The crisis spurred a major, decade-long population decline.

Reemergence as a mixed economy, 1985–present

After bottoming out in the 1980s, Iowa's economy began to reduce its dependence on agriculture. By the early 21st century, it was characterized by a mix of manufacturing, biotechnology, finance and insurance services, and government services. The population of Iowa has increased at a slower rate than the U.S. as a whole since at least the 1900 census, though Iowa now has a predominantly urban population. The Iowa Economic Development Authority, created in 2011 has replaced the Iowa Department of Economic Development and its annual reports are a source of economic information.

Geography

Boundaries

Iowa is bordered by the Mississippi River on the east along with the Missouri River and the Big Sioux River on the west. The northern boundary is a line along 43 degrees, 30 minutes north latitude. The southern border is the Des Moines River and a not-quite-straight line along approximately 40 degrees 35 minutes north, as decided by the U.S. Supreme Court in Missouri v. Iowa (1849) after a standoff between Missouri and Iowa known as the Honey War.

Iowa is the only state whose east and west borders are formed almost entirely by rivers. Carter Lake, Iowa, is the only city in the state located west of the Missouri River.

Iowa has 99 counties, but 100 county seats because Lee County has two. The state capital, Des Moines, is in Polk County.

Geology and terrain

Iowa's bedrock geology generally decreases in age from east to west. In northwest Iowa, Cretaceous bedrock can be 74 million years old; in eastern Iowa Cambrian bedrock dates to c. 500 million years ago. The oldest radiometrically dated bedrock in the state is the 2.9 billion year old Otter Creek Layered Mafic Complex. Precambrian rock is exposed only in the northwest of the state.

Iowa can be divided into eight landforms based on glaciation, soils, topography, and river drainage. Loess hills lie along the western border of the state, some of which are several hundred feet thick. Northeast Iowa along the Upper Mississippi River is part of the Driftless Area, consisting of steep hills and valleys which appear as mountainous.

Several natural lakes exist, most notably Spirit Lake, West Okoboji Lake, and East Okoboji Lake in northwest Iowa (see Iowa Great Lakes). To the east lies Clear Lake. Man-made lakes include Lake Odessa, Saylorville Lake, Lake Red Rock, Coralville Lake, Lake MacBride, and Rathbun Lake. Before European settlement, 4 to 6 million acres of the state was covered with wetlands, about 95% of these wetlands have been drained.

Ecology and environment

Iowa's natural vegetation is tallgrass prairie and savanna in upland areas, with dense forest and wetlands in flood plains and protected river valleys, and pothole wetlands in northern prairie areas. Most of Iowa is used for agriculture; crops cover 60% of the state, grasslands (mostly pasture and hay with some prairie and wetland) cover 30%, and forests cover 7%; urban areas and water cover another 1% each.

The southern part of Iowa is categorized as the Central forest-grasslands transition ecoregion. The Northern, drier part of Iowa is categorized as part of the Central tall grasslands.

There is a dearth of natural areas in Iowa; less than 1% of the tallgrass prairie that once covered most of Iowa remains intact; only about 5% of the state's prairie pothole wetlands remain, and most of the original forest has been lost.  Iowa ranked 49th of U.S. states in public land holdings. Threatened or endangered animals in Iowa include the interior least tern, piping plover, Indiana bat, pallid sturgeon, the Iowa Pleistocene land snail, Higgins' eye pearly mussel, and the Topeka shiner. Endangered or threatened plants include western prairie fringed orchid, eastern prairie fringed orchid, Mead's milkweed, prairie bush clover, and northern wild monkshood.

The explosion in the number of high-density livestock facilities in Iowa has led to increased rural water contamination and a decline in air quality.

Other factors negatively affecting Iowa's environment include the extensive use of older coal-fired power plants, fertilizer and pesticide runoff from crop production, and diminishment of the Jordan Aquifer.

Climate

Iowa has a humid continental climate throughout the state (Köppen climate classification Dfa) with extremes of both heat and cold. Snowfall is common, with Des Moines getting about 26 days of snowfall a year, and other places, such as Shenandoah getting about 11 days of snowfall in a year.

Spring ushers in the beginning of the severe weather season. Iowa averages about 50 days of thunderstorm activity per year. The 30-year annual average of tornadoes in Iowa is 47. In 2008, twelve people were killed by tornadoes in Iowa, making it the deadliest year since 1968 and also the second most tornadoes in a year with 105, matching the total from 2001.

Iowa summers are known for heat and humidity, with daytime temperatures sometimes near  and occasionally exceeding . Average winters in the state have been known to drop well below freezing, even dropping below .

The pattern of precipitation across Iowa is seasonal, with more rain falling in the summer months. Virtually statewide, the driest month is January or February, and the wettest month is June, owing to frequent showers and thunderstorms, some of which produce hail, damaging winds and/or tornadoes.

Settlements 

Iowa's population is more urban than rural, with 61 percent living in urban areas in 2000, a trend that began in the early 20th century. Urban counties in Iowa grew 8.5% from 2000 to 2008, while rural counties declined by 4.2%. The shift from rural to urban has caused population increases in more urbanized counties such as Dallas, Johnson, Linn, Polk, and Scott, at the expense of more rural counties.

Iowa, in common with other Midwestern states (especially Kansas, Nebraska, North Dakota, and South Dakota), is feeling the brunt of rural flight, although Iowa has been gaining population since approximately 1990. Some smaller communities, such as Denison and Storm Lake, have mitigated this population loss through gains in immigrant laborers.

Another demographic problem for Iowa is the brain drain, in which educated young adults leave the state in search of better prospects in higher education or employment. During the 1990s, Iowa had the second highest exodus rate for single, educated young adults, second only to North Dakota.

Demographics

Population

The United States Census Bureau determined the population of Iowa was 3,190,369 on April 1, 2020, a 4.73% increase since the 2010 United States census.

Of the residents of Iowa, 70.8% were born in Iowa, 23.6% were born in a different U.S. state, 0.6% were born in Puerto Rico, U.S. Island areas, or born abroad to American parent(s), and 5% were foreign born.

Immigration from outside the United States resulted in a net increase of 29,386 people, while migration within the country produced a net loss of 41,140 people. 6.5% of Iowa's population were reported as under the age of five, 22.6% under 18, and 14.7% were 65 or older. Males made up approximately 49.6% of the population. The population density of the state is 52.7 people per square mile. As of the 2010 census, the center of population of Iowa is in Marshall County, near Melbourne.

As of the 2010 census, the population of Iowa was 3,046,355. The gender makeup of the state was 49.5% male and 50.5% female. 23.9% of the population were under the age of 18; 61.2% were between the ages of 18 and 64; and 14.9% were 65 years of age or older.

According to HUD's 2022 Annual Homeless Assessment Report, there were an estimated 2,419 homeless people in Iowa. 

According to the 2016 American Community Survey, 5.6% of Iowa's population were of Hispanic or Latino origin (of any race): Mexican (4.3%), Puerto Rican (0.2%), Cuban (0.1%), and other Hispanic or Latino origin (1.0%). The five largest ancestry groups were: German (35.1%), Irish (13.5%), English (8.2%), American (5.8%), and Norwegian (5.0%).

Birth data

Note: Births in table don't add up, because Hispanics are counted both by their ethnicity and by their race, giving a higher overall number.

 Since 2016, data for births of White Hispanic origin are not collected, but included in one Hispanic group; persons of Hispanic origin may be of any race.

Religion

A 2014 survey by Pew Research Center found 60% of Iowans are Protestant, while 18% are Catholic, and 1% are of non-Christian religions. 21% responded with non-religious, and 1% did not answer. A survey from the Association of Religion Data Archives (ARDA) in 2010 found that the largest Protestant denominations were the United Methodist Church with 235,190 adherents and the Evangelical Lutheran Church in America with 229,557. The largest non-Protestant religion was Catholicism with 503,080 adherents. The state has a great number of Calvinist denominations. The Presbyterian Church (USA) had almost 290 congregations and 51,380 members followed by the Reformed Church in America with 80 churches and 40,000 members, and the United Church of Christ had 180 churches and 39,000 members. According to the 2020 Public Religion Research Institute's study, 26% of the population were irreligious.

The study Religious Congregations & Membership: 2000 found in the southernmost two tiers of Iowa counties and in other counties in the center of the state, the largest religious group was the United Methodist Church; in the northeast part of the state, including Dubuque and Linn counties (where Cedar Rapids is located), the Catholic Church was the largest; and in ten counties, including three in the northern tier, the Evangelical Lutheran Church in America was the largest. The study also found rapid growth in Evangelical Christian denominations. Dubuque is home to the Archdiocese of Dubuque, which serves as the ecclesiastical province for all three other dioceses in the state and for all the Catholics in the entire state of Iowa.

Historically, religious sects and orders who desired to live apart from the rest of society established themselves in Iowa, such as the Amish and Mennonite near Kalona and in other parts of eastern Iowa such as Davis County and Buchanan County. Other religious sects and orders living apart include Quakers around West Branch and Le Grand, German Pietists who founded the Amana Colonies, followers of Transcendental Meditation who founded Maharishi Vedic City, and Order of Cistercians of the Strict Observance monks and nuns at the New Melleray and Our Lady of the Mississippi Abbies near Dubuque.

 about 6,000 Jews live in Iowa, with about 3,000 of them in Des Moines.

Language

English is the most common language in Iowa, being the sole language spoken by 91.1% of the population. One of the less common languages spoken is sign language and indigenous speaking. The total amount of sign language spoken is about 2.5% of the general population as of 2017. With indigenous speaking, it is about 0.5% of the population. William Labov and colleagues, in the monumental Atlas of North American English found the English spoken in Iowa divides into multiple linguistic regions. Natives of northern Iowa—including Sioux City, Fort Dodge, and the Waterloo region—tend to speak the dialect linguists call North Central American English, which is also found in North and South Dakota, Minnesota, Wisconsin, and Michigan. Natives of central and southern Iowa—including such cities as Council Bluffs, Davenport, Des Moines, and Iowa City—tend to speak the North Midland dialect also found in eastern Nebraska, central Illinois, and central Indiana. Natives of East-Central Iowa—including cities such as Cedar Rapids, Dubuque, and Clinton tend to speak with the Northern Cities Vowel Shift, a dialect that extends from this area and east across the Great Lakes Region.

After English, Spanish is the second-most-common language spoken in Iowa, with 120,000 people in Iowa of Hispanic or Latino origin and 47,000 people born in Latin America. The third-most-common language is German, spoken by 17,000 people in Iowa; two notable German dialects used in Iowa include Amana German spoken around the Amana Colonies, and Pennsylvania German, spoken among the Amish in Iowa. The Babel Proclamation of 1918 banned the speaking of German in public. Around Pella, residents of Dutch descent once spoke the Pella Dutch dialect.

Attractions

Central Iowa
 Ames is the home of Iowa State University, the Iowa State Center, and Reiman Gardens.

Des Moines is the largest city and metropolitan area in Iowa and the state's political and economic center. It is home to the Iowa State Capitol, the State Historical Society of Iowa Museum, Drake University, Des Moines Art Center, Greater Des Moines Botanical Garden, Principal Riverwalk, the Iowa State Fair, Terrace Hill, and the World Food Prize. Nearby attractions include Adventureland and Prairie Meadows Racetrack Casino in Altoona, Living History Farms in Urbandale, Trainland USA in Colfax, and the Iowa Speedway and Valle Drive-In in Newton.

Boone hosts the biennial Farm Progress Show and is home to the Mamie Doud Eisenhower museum, the Boone & Scenic Valley Railroad, and Ledges State Park.

The Meskwaki Settlement west of Tama is the only American Indian settlement in Iowa and is host to a large annual Pow-wow.

Madison County is known for its covered bridges. Also in Madison County is the John Wayne Birthplace Museum is in Winterset.

Other communities with vibrant historic downtown areas include Newton, Indianola, Pella, Knoxville, Marshalltown, Perry, and Story City.

Eastern Iowa

Iowa City is home to the University of Iowa, which includes the Iowa Writers' Workshop, and the Old Capitol building. Because of the extraordinary history in the teaching and sponsoring of creative writing that emanated from the Iowa Writers' Workshop and related programs, Iowa City was the first American city designated by the United Nations as a "City of Literature" in the UNESCO Creative Cities Network.

The Herbert Hoover National Historic Site and Herbert Hoover Presidential Library and Museum are in West Branch.

The Amana Colonies are a group of settlements of German Pietists comprising seven villages listed as National Historic Landmarks.

The Cedar Rapids Museum of Art has collections of paintings by Grant Wood and Marvin Cone. Cedar Rapids is also home to the National Czech & Slovak Museum & Library and Iowa's only National Trust for Historic Preservation Site, Brucemore mansion.

Davenport boasts the Figge Art Museum, River Music Experience, Putnam Museum, Davenport Skybridge, Quad City Symphony Orchestra, Ballet Quad Cities, and plays host to the annual Bix Beiderbecke Memorial Jazz Festival, and the Quad City Air Show, which is the largest airshow in the state.

Other communities with vibrant historic downtown areas include West Liberty, Fairfield, Burlington, Mount Pleasant, Fort Madison, LeClaire, Mount Vernon, Ottumwa, Washington, and Wilton.

Along Interstate 80 near Walcott lies the world's largest truck stop, Iowa 80.

Western Iowa

Some of the most dramatic scenery in Iowa is found in the unique Loess Hills which are found along Iowa's western border.

Sioux City is the largest city in western Iowa and is found on the convergence of the Missouri, Floyd, and Big Sioux Rivers. The Sioux City Metropolitan Area encompasses areas in three states: Iowa, Nebraska, and South Dakota. Sioux City boasts a revitalized downtown and includes attractions such as the Hard Rock Hotel and Casino, Sergeant Floyd Monument, Sergeant Floyd River Museum, the Tyson Events Center, Southern Hills Mall, the Orpheum Theater, and more. The historic downtown area is also filled with multiple restaurants, bars, and other entertainment venues. Sioux City is home to two higher education institutions, Morningside College and Briar Cliff University. Le Mars is in the northeastern part of the Sioux City Metropolitan Area and is the self-proclaimed "Ice Cream Capital of the World". Le Mars is home to Wells Enterprises, one of the largest ice cream manufacturers in the world. Attractions in Le Mars include the Wells Visitor Center and Ice Cream Parlor, Archie's Wayside (steak house), Bob's Drive Inn, Tonsfeldt Round Barn, Plymouth County Fairgrounds, Plymouth County Museum, and Plymouth County Courthouse. Le Mars hosts multiple ice cream-themed community events each year.

Council Bluffs, part of the Omaha (Nebr.) Metropolitan Area and a hub of southwest Iowa sits at the base of the Loess Hills National Scenic Byway. With three casino resorts, the city also includes such cultural attractions as the Western Hills Trails Center, Union Pacific Railroad Museum, the Grenville M. Dodge House, The Black Angel, and the Lewis and Clark Monument, with clear views of the Downtown Omaha skyline found throughout the city.

The Iowa Great Lakes is made up of multiple small towns, such as Spirit Lake, Arnolds Park, Milford, and Okoboji. Multiple resorts and other tourist attractions are found in and around these towns surrounding the popular lakes. Arnolds Park, one of the oldest amusement parks in the country, is located on Lake Okoboji in Arnolds Park.

The Sanford Museum and Planetarium in Cherokee, Grotto of the Redemption in West Bend, The Danish Immigrant Museum in Elk Horn, and the Fort Museum and Frontier Village in Fort Dodge are other regional destinations.

Every year in early May, the city of Orange City holds the annual Tulip Festival, a celebration of the strong Dutch heritage in the region.

Northwest Iowa is home to some of the largest concentrations of wind turbine farms in the world. Other western communities with vibrant historic downtown areas include Storm Lake, Spencer, Glenwood, Carroll, Harlan, Atlantic, Red Oak, Denison, Creston, Mount Ayr, Sac City, and Walnut.

Northeast and Northern Iowa

The Driftless Area of northeast Iowa has many steep hills and deep valleys, checkered with forest and terraced fields. Effigy Mounds National Monument in Allamakee and Clayton Counties has the largest assemblage of animal-shaped prehistoric mounds in the world.

Waterloo is home of the Grout Museum and Lost Island Theme Park and is headquarters of the Silos & Smokestacks National Heritage Area. Cedar Falls is home of the University of Northern Iowa.

Dubuque is a regional tourist destination with attractions such as the National Mississippi River Museum and Aquarium and the Port of Dubuque.

Dyersville is home to the famed Field of Dreams baseball diamond. Maquoketa Caves State Park, near Maquoketa, contains more caves than any other state park.

Fort Atkinson State Preserve in Fort Atkinson has the remains of an original 1840s Dragoon fortification.

Fort Dodge is home of The Fort historical museum and the Blanden Art Museum, and host Frontiers Days which celebrate the town history.

Other communities with vibrant historic downtown areas include Decorah, McGregor, Mason City, Elkader, Bellevue, Guttenberg, Algona, Spillville, Charles City, and Independence.

Statewide

Iowa Historic Bike Ride RAGBRAI, the Register's Annual Great Bicycle Ride Across Iowa, attracts thousands of bicyclists and support personnel. It has crossed the state on various routes each year since 1973. Iowa is home to more than 70 wineries, and hosts five regional wine tasting trails. Many Iowa communities hold farmers' markets during warmer months; these are typically weekly events, but larger cities can host multiple markets.

Economy

 In 2016, the total employment of the state's population was 1,354,487, and the total number of employer establishments was 81,563.
CNBC's list of "Top States for Business in 2010" has recognized Iowa as the sixth best state in the nation. Scored in 10 individual categories, Iowa was ranked first when it came to the "Cost of Doing Business"; this includes all taxes, utility costs, and other costs associated with doing business. Iowa was also ranked 10th in "Economy", 12th in "Business Friendliness", 16th in "Education", 17th in both "Cost of Living" and "Quality of Life", 20th in "Workforce", 29th in "Technology and Innovation", 32nd in "Transportation" and the lowest ranking was 36th in "Access to Capital".

While Iowa is often viewed as a farming state, agriculture is a relatively small portion of the state's diversified economy, with manufacturing, biotechnology, finance and insurance services, and government services contributing substantially to Iowa's economy. This economic diversity has helped Iowa weather the late 2000s recession better than most states, with unemployment substantially lower than the rest of the nation.

If the economy is measured by gross domestic product, in 2005 Iowa's GDP was about $124 billion. If measured by gross state product, for 2005 it was $113.5 billion. Its per capita income for 2006 was $23,340.

On July 2, 2009, Standard & Poor's rated the state of Iowa's credit as AAA (the highest of its credit ratings, held by only 11 U.S. state governments).

As of September 2021, the state's unemployment rate is 4.0%.

Manufacturing

Manufacturing is the largest sector of Iowa's economy, with $20.8 billion (21%) of Iowa's 2003 gross state product. Major manufacturing sectors include food processing, heavy machinery, and agricultural chemicals. Sixteen percent of Iowa's workforce is dedicated to manufacturing.

Food processing is the largest component of manufacturing. Besides processed food, industrial outputs include machinery, electric equipment, chemical products, publishing, and primary metals. Companies with direct or indirect processing facilities in Iowa include ConAgra Foods, Wells Blue Bunny, Barilla, Heinz, Tone's Spices, General Mills, and Quaker Oats. Meatpacker Tyson Foods has 11 locations, second only to its headquarter state Arkansas.

Major non-food manufacturing firms with production facilities in Iowa include 3M, Arconic, Amana Corporation, Emerson Electric, The HON Company, SSAB, John Deere, Lennox Manufacturing, Pella Corporation, Procter & Gamble, Vermeer Company, and Winnebago Industries.

Agriculture

Though industrial-scale, commodity agriculture predominates in much of the state, Iowa has seen growth in the organic farming sector. Iowa ranks fifth in the nation in total number of organic farms. In 2016, there were approximately 732 organic farms in the state, an increase of about 5% from the previous year, and 103,136 organic acres, an increase of 9,429 from the previous year. Iowa has also seen an increase in demand for local, sustainably-grown food. Northeast Iowa, part of the Driftless Area, has led the state in development of its regional food system and grows and consumes more local food than any other region in Iowa.

Iowa's Driftless Region is also home to the nationally recognized Seed Savers Exchange, a non-profit seed bank housed at an 890-acre heritage farm near Decorah, in the northeast corner of the state. The largest nongovernmental seed bank of its kind in the United States, Seed Savers Exchange safeguards more than 20,000 varieties of rare, heirloom seeds.

As of 2007, the direct production and sale of conventional agricultural commodities contributed only about 3.5% of Iowa's gross state product. In 2002 the impact of the indirect role of agriculture in Iowa's economy, including agriculture-affiliated business, was calculated at 16.4% in terms of value added and 24.3% in terms of total output. This was lower than the economic impact of non-farm manufacturing, which accounted for 22.4% of total value added and 26.5% of total output. Iowa's main conventional agricultural commodities are hogs, corn, soybeans, oats, cattle, eggs, and dairy products. Iowa is the nation's largest producer of ethanol and corn and some years is the largest grower of soybeans. In 2008, the 92,600 farms in Iowa produced 19% of the nation's corn, 17% of the soybeans, 30% of the hogs, and 14% of the eggs.

 major Iowa agricultural product processors include Archer Daniels Midland, Cargill, Inc., Diamond V Mills, and Quaker Oats.

Health insurance

As of 2014, there were 16 organizations offering health insurance products in Iowa, per the State of Iowa Insurance Division.
Iowa was fourth out of ten states with the biggest drop in competition levels of health insurance between 2010 and 2011, per the 2013 annual report on the level of competition in the health insurance industry by the American Medical Association using 2011 data from HealthLeaders-Interstudy, the most comprehensive source of data on enrollment in health maintenance organization (HMO), preferred provider organization (PPO), point-of-service (POS) and consumer-driven health care plans.
According to the AMA annual report from 2007 Wellmark Blue Cross Blue Shield had provided 71% of the state's health insurance.

The Iowa Insurance Division "Annual report to the Iowa Governor and the Iowa Legislature" from November 2014 looked at the 95% of health insurers by premium, which are 10 companies. It found Wellmark Inc. to dominate the three health insurance markets it examined (individual, small group and large group) at 52–67%. Wellmark HealthPlan of Iowa and Wellmark Inc had the highest risk-based capital percentages of all 10 providers at 1158% and 1132%, respectively. Rising RBC is an indication of profits.

Other sectors

Iowa has a strong financial and insurance sector, with approximately 6,100 firms, including AEGON, Nationwide Group, Aviva USA, Farm Bureau Financial Services, Voya Financial, Marsh Affinity Group, MetLife, Principal Financial Group, Principal Capital Management, Wells Fargo, and Greenstate Credit Union (formerly University of Iowa Community Credit Union).

Iowa is host to at least two business incubators, Iowa State University Research Park and the BioVentures Center at the University of Iowa. The Research Park hosts about 50 companies, among them NewLink Genetics, which develops cancer immunotherapeutics, and the U.S. animal health division of Boehringer Ingelheim, Vetmedica.

Ethanol production consumes about a third of Iowa's corn production, and renewable fuels account for eight percent of the state's gross domestic product. A total of 39 ethanol plants produced  of fuel in 2009.

Renewable energy has become a major economic force in northern and western Iowa, with wind turbine electrical generation increasing exponentially since 1990. In 2019, wind power in Iowa accounted for 42% of electrical energy produced, and 10,201 megawatts of generating capacity had been installed at the end of the year. Iowa ranked first of U.S. states in percentage of total power generated by wind and second in wind generating capacity behind Texas. Major producers of turbines and components in Iowa include Acciona Energy of West Branch, TPI Composites of Newton, and Siemens Energy of Fort Madison.

In 2016, Iowa was the headquarters for three of the top 2,000 companies for revenue. They include Principal Financial, Rockwell Collins, and American Equity Investment. Iowa is also headquarters to other companies including Hy-Vee, Pella Corporation, Workiva, Vermeer Company, Kum & Go gas stations, Von Maur, Pioneer Hi-Bred, and Fareway.

Taxation

Tax is collected by the Iowa Department of Revenue.

Iowa imposes taxes on net state income of individuals, estates, and trusts. There are nine income tax brackets, ranging from 0.36% to 8.98%, as well as four corporate income tax brackets ranging from 6%to 12%, giving Iowa the country's highest marginal corporate tax rate. The state sales tax rate is 6%, with non-prepared food having no tax. Iowa has one local option sales tax that may be imposed by counties after an election. Property tax is levied on the taxable value of real property. Iowa has more than 2,000 taxing authorities. Most property is taxed by more than one taxing authority. The tax rate differs in each locality and is a composite of county, city or rural township, school district and special levies. Iowa allows its residents to deduct their federal income taxes from their state income taxes.

Education

Primary and secondary schools

Iowa was one of the leading states in the high school movement, and continues to be among the top educational performers today.

The four-year graduation rate for high schoolers was 91.3% in 2017. Iowa's schools are credited with the highest graduation rate in the nation as of 2019. Iowa has 333 school districts, 1,329 school buildings and has the 14th lowest student-to-teacher ratio of 14.2. Teacher pay is ranked 22nd, with the average salary being $55,647.

 transportation spending is a significant part of the budgets of rural school districts as many are geographically large and must transport students across vast distances. This reduces the amount of money spent on other aspects of the districts.

The state's oldest functioning school building is located in Bellevue in the historic Jackson County Courthouse which has been in continuous use as a school since 1848.

Colleges and universities

The Iowa Board of Regents is composed of nine citizen volunteers appointed by the governor to provide policymaking, coordination, and oversight of the state's three public universities, two special K–12 schools, and affiliated centers.

The special K–12 schools include the Iowa School for the Deaf in Council Bluffs and the Iowa Braille and Sight Saving School in Vinton. Both Iowa State University and The University of Iowa are research universities with The University of Iowa also being a member of the prestigious Association of American Universities. In addition to the three state universities, Iowa has multiple private colleges and universities.

Transportation

Interstate highways

Iowa has four primary interstate highways. Interstate 29 (I-29) travels along the state's western edge through Council Bluffs and Sioux City. I-35 travels from the Missouri state line to the Minnesota state line through the state's center, including Des Moines. I-74 begins at I-80 just northeast of Davenport. I-80 travels from the Nebraska state line to the Illinois state line through the center of the state, including Council Bluffs, Des Moines, Iowa City, and the Quad Cities. I-380 is an auxiliary Interstate Highway, which travels from I-80 near Iowa City through Cedar Rapids ending in Waterloo and is part of the Avenue of the Saints highway. Iowa is among the few jurisdictions where municipalities install speed cameras on interstate highways providing a substantial revenue source from out of state drivers.

Airports with scheduled flights

Iowa is served by several regional airports including the Des Moines International Airport, the Eastern Iowa Airport, in Cedar Rapids, Quad City International Airport, in Moline, Illinois, and Eppley Airfield, in Omaha, Nebraska. Smaller airports in the state include the Davenport Municipal Airport (Iowa), Dubuque Regional Airport, Fort Dodge Regional Airport, Mason City Municipal Airport, Sioux Gateway Airport, Southeast Iowa Regional Airport, and Waterloo Regional Airport.

Railroads

Amtrak's California Zephyr serves southern Iowa with stops in Burlington, Mount Pleasant, Ottumwa, Osceola, and Creston along its route between Chicago and Emeryville, California. Fort Madison is served by Amtrak's Southwest Chief, running between Chicago and Los Angeles. Both trains currently run tri-weekly and are expected to return to daily service in June.

Public Transit
Iowa is served by a number of local transit providers including Bettendorf Transit, Cambus, Cedar Rapids Transit, Coralville Transit, Cyride, Davenport Citibus, Des Moines Area Regional Transit, Iowa City Transit, The Jule, MET Transit, Omaha Metro Transit, Ottumwa Transit Authority, Quad Cities MetroLINK and Sioux City Transit.

Intercity bus service in the state is provided by Burlington Trailways and Jefferson Lines.

Law and government

State

, the 43rd and current Governor of Iowa is Kim Reynolds (R). Other statewide elected officials are:
 Adam Gregg (R), Lieutenant Governor
 Paul Pate (R), Secretary of State
 Rob Sand (D), Auditor of State
 Roby Smith (R), Treasurer of State
 Mike Naig (R), Secretary of Agriculture 
 Brenna Bird (R), Attorney General

The Code of Iowa contains Iowa's statutory laws. It is periodically updated by the Iowa Legislative Service Bureau, with a new edition published in odd-numbered years and a supplement published in even-numbered years.

Iowa is an alcohol monopoly or alcoholic beverage control state.

National

The two U.S. Senators:
 Chuck Grassley (R), in office since 1981
 Joni Ernst (R), in office since 2015

The four U.S. Representatives:
 Ashley Hinson (R), First district
 Mariannette Miller-Meeks (R), Second district
 Zach Nunn (R), Third district
 Randy Feenstra (R), Fourth district

After the 2010 United States Census and the resulting redistricting, Iowa lost one seat in Congress, falling to four seats in the U.S. House of Representatives. Incumbent U.S. Representatives Leonard Boswell (D) and Tom Latham (R) ran against each other in 2012 in the third congressional district which had new boundaries; Latham won and retired after the 2014 elections. King represented the old fifth congressional district.

Political parties

In Iowa, the term "political party" refers to political organizations which have received two percent or more of the votes cast for president or governor in the "last preceding general election". Iowa recognizes three political parties—the Republican Party, the Democratic Party, and the Libertarian Party. The Libertarian Party obtained official political party status in 2017 as a result of presidential candidate Gary Johnson receiving 3.8% of the Iowa vote in the 2016 general election. Third parties, officially termed "nonparty political organizations", can appear on the ballot as well. Four of these have had candidates on the ballot in Iowa since 2004 for various positions: the Constitution Party, the Green Party, the Pirate Party, and the Socialist Workers Party.

Voter trends

As a result of the 2010 elections, each party controlled one house of the Iowa General Assembly: the House had a Republican majority, while the Senate had a Democratic majority. As a result of the 2016 elections, Republicans gained control of the Senate. Incumbent Democratic governor Chet Culver was defeated in 2010 by Republican Terry Branstad, who had served as governor from 1983 to 1999. On December 14, 2015, Branstad became the longest serving governor in U.S. history, serving (at that time) 20 years, 11 months, and 3days; eclipsing George Clinton, who served 21 years until 1804. Lieutenant Governor Kim Reynolds succeeded him on May 24, 2017, following Branstad's appointment as U.S. Ambassador to China.

Presidential caucus

The state gets considerable attention every four years because the Iowa caucus, gatherings of voters to select delegates to the state conventions, is the first presidential caucus in the country. The caucuses, held in January or February of the election year, involve people gathering in homes or public places and choosing their candidates, rather than casting secret ballots as is done in a presidential primary election.
Along with the New Hampshire primary the following week, Iowa's caucuses have become the starting points for choosing the two major-party candidates for president. The national and international media give Iowa and New Hampshire extensive attention, which gives Iowa voters leverage. In 2007 presidential campaign spending was the seventh highest in the country.

Civil rights
In a 2020 study, Iowa was ranked as the 24th easiest state for citizens to vote in.

Racial equality

In the 19th century Iowa was among the earliest states to enact prohibitions against race discrimination, especially in education, but was slow to achieve full integration in the 20th century. In the first decision of the Iowa Supreme Court—In Re the Matter of Ralph, decided July 1839—the Court rejected slavery in a decision that found a slave named Ralph became free when he stepped on Iowa soil, 26 years before the end of the Civil War. The state did away with racial barriers to marriage in 1851, more than 100 years before the U.S. Supreme Court would ban miscegenation statutes nationwide.

The Iowa Supreme Court decided Clark v. The board of directors in 1868, ruling that racially segregated "separate but equal" schools had no place in Iowa, 85 years before Brown v. Board of Education. By 1875, a number of additional court rulings effectively ended segregation in Iowa schools. Social and housing discrimination continued against Blacks at state universities until the 1950s. The Court heard Coger v. The North Western Union Packet Co. in 1873, ruling against racial discrimination in public accommodations 91 years before the U.S. Supreme Court reached the same decision.

In 1884, the Iowa Civil Rights Act apparently outlawed discrimination by businesses, reading: "All persons within this state shall be entitled to the full and equal enjoyment of the accommodations, advantages, facilities, and privileges of inns, restaurants, chophouses, eating houses, lunch counters, and all other places where refreshments are served, public conveyances, barber shops, bathhouses, theaters, and all other places of amusement." However, the courts chose to narrowly apply this act, allowing de facto discrimination to continue. Racial discrimination at public businesses was not deemed illegal until 1949, when the court ruled in State of Iowa v. Katz that businesses had to serve customers regardless of race; the case began when Edna Griffin was denied service at a Des Moines drugstore. Full racial civil rights were codified under the Iowa Civil Rights Act of 1965.

Women's rights

As with racial equality, Iowa was a vanguard in women's rights in the mid-19th century, but did not allow women the right to vote until the Nineteenth Amendment to the United States Constitution was ratified in 1920, Iowa legislature being one of the ratifying votes. In 1847, the University of Iowa became the first public university in the U.S. to admit men and women on an equal basis. In 1869, Iowa became the first state in the union to admit women to the practice of law, with the Court ruling women may not be denied the right to practice law in Iowa and admitting Arabella A. Mansfield to the practice of law. Several attempts to grant full voting rights to Iowa women were defeated between 1870 and 1919. In 1894 women were given "partial suffrage", which allowed them to vote on issues, but not for candidates. It was not until the ratification of the Nineteenth Amendment that women had full suffrage in Iowa. Although Iowa supported the Federal Equal Rights Amendment, in 1980 and 1992 Iowa voters rejected an Equal Rights Amendment to the state constitution. Iowa added the word "women" to the Iowa Constitution in 1998. After the amendment, it reads: "All men and women are, by nature, free and equal, and have certain inalienable rights—among which are those of enjoying and defending life and liberty, acquiring, possessing and protecting property, and pursuing and obtaining safety and happiness."

In May 2018 Iowa signed into law one of the country's most restrictive abortion bans: the requirement that a doctor cannot perform an abortion if they can detect a fetal heartbeat, which in many cases would restrict abortions pregnancies less than six weeks old. It was struck down in January 2019, when an Iowa state judge ruled that the "fetal heartbeat" law was unconstitutional.

LGBT rights

The state's law criminalizing same-sex sexual activity was repealed in June 1976, 27 years before Lawrence v. Texas. In 2007, the Iowa Legislature added "sexual orientation" and "gender identity" to the protected classes listed in the Iowa Civil Rights Act.

On April 3, 2009, the Iowa Supreme Court decided Varnum v. Brien, holding in a unanimous decision, the state's law forbidding same-sex marriage was unconstitutional. This made Iowa the third state in the U.S. and first in the Midwest to permit same-sex marriage.

Culture

Arts

The Clint Eastwood movie The Bridges of Madison County, based on the popular novel of the same name, took place and was filmed in Madison County. What's Eating Gilbert Grape, based on the Peter Hedges novel of the same name, is set in the fictional Iowa town of Endora. Hedges was born in West Des Moines.

Des Moines is home to members of the famous metal band Slipknot. The state is mentioned in the band's songs, and the album Iowa is named after the state.

Sports

The state has four major college teams playing in NCAA Division I for all sports. In football, Iowa State University and the University of Iowa compete in the Football Bowl Subdivision (FBS), whereas the University of Northern Iowa and Drake University compete in the Football Championship Subdivision (FCS). Although Iowa has no professional major league sports teams, Iowa has minor league sports teams in baseball, basketball, hockey, and other sports.

The following table shows the Iowa sports teams with average attendance over 8,000. All the following teams are NCAA Division I football, basketball, or wrestling teams:

College sports

The state has four NCAA Division I college teams. In NCAA FBS, the University of Iowa Hawkeyes play in the Big Ten Conference and the Iowa State University Cyclones compete in the Big 12 Conference. The two intrastate rivals compete annually for the Cy-Hawk Trophy as part of the Iowa Corn Cy-Hawk Series.

In wrestling, the Iowa Hawkeyes and Iowa State Cyclones have won a combined total of over 30 team NCAA Division I titles. The Northern Iowa and Cornell College wrestling teams have also each won one NCAA Division I wrestling team title.

In NCAA FCS, the University of Northern Iowa Panthers play at the Missouri Valley Conference and Missouri Valley Football Conference (despite the similar names, the conferences are administratively separate), whereas the Drake University Bulldogs play at the Missouri Valley Conference in most sports and Pioneer League for football.

Baseball

Des Moines is home to the Iowa Cubs, a Triple-A Minor League Baseball team of the International League and affiliate of the Chicago Cubs. Iowa has two High-A minor league teams in the High-A Central: the Cedar Rapids Kernels and the Quad Cities River Bandits. The Sioux City Explorers are part of the American Association of Professional Baseball.

Ice hockey

Des Moines is home to the Iowa Wild, who are affiliated with the Minnesota Wild and are members of the American Hockey League. Coralville has an ECHL team called the Iowa Heartlanders as the 2021–22 season.

The United States Hockey League has five teams in Iowa: the Cedar Rapids RoughRiders, Sioux City Musketeers, Waterloo Black Hawks, Des Moines Buccaneers, and the Dubuque Fighting Saints. The North Iowa Bulls of the North American Hockey League (NAHL) and the Mason City Toros of the North American 3 Hockey League (NA3HL) both play in Mason City.

Soccer

The Des Moines Menace of the USL League Two play their home games at Drake Stadium (Drake University) in Des Moines, Iowa. 
The Drake Bulldogs have a men's and women's soccer team.
the Cedar Rapids Inferno Soccer Club of the Midwest Premier League play their home games at Robert W. Plaster Athletic Complex at Mount Mercy University
the Iowa Raptors FC of the USL League Two play their home games at K. Raymond Clark Field at Coe College
Union Dubuque F.C. of the Midwest Premier League

Other sports

Iowa has two professional basketball teams. The Iowa Wolves, an NBA G League team that plays in Des Moines, is owned and affiliated with the Minnesota Timberwolves of the NBA. The Sioux City Hornets play in the American Basketball Association.

Iowa has three professional football teams. The Sioux City Bandits play in the Champions Indoor Football league. The Iowa Barnstormers play in the Indoor Football League at Wells Fargo Arena in Des Moines. The Cedar Rapids Titans play in the Indoor Football League at the U.S. Cellular Center.

The Iowa Speedway oval track has hosted auto racing championships such as the IndyCar Series, NASCAR Nationwide Series and NASCAR Truck Series since 2006. Also, the Knoxville Raceway dirt track hosts the Knoxville Nationals, one of the classic sprint car racing events.

The John Deere Classic is a PGA Tour golf event held in the Quad Cities since 1971. The Principal Charity Classic is a Champions Tour event since 2001. The Des Moines Golf and Country Club hosted the 1999 U.S. Senior Open and the 2017 Solheim Cup.

Sister jurisdictions

Iowa has ten official partner jurisdictions:
  Yamanashi Prefecture, Japan (1960)
  Yucatán, Mexico (1964)
  Hebei Province, People's Republic of China (1983)
  Terengganu, Malaysia (1987)
  Taiwan, Republic of China (1989)
  Stavropol Krai, USSR/Russia (1989)
  Cherkasy Oblast, Ukraine (1996)
  Veneto Region, Italy (1997)
  Republic of Kosovo (2013)

See also
 Index of Iowa-related articles
 Outline of Iowa
 USS Iowa, 4 ships

Notes

References

External links

 
 State Data Center of Iowa population, housing, business and government statistics
 Iowa Travel and Tourism Division
 Iowa State Facts from USDA
 Energy Data & Statistics for Iowa—U.S. Department of Energy
 Iowa State Databases—Annotated list of searchable databases produced by Iowa state agencies and compiled by the Government Documents Roundtable of the American Library Association.
 U.S. Census Bureau Quick Facts
 
 
 

 
States of the United States
Midwestern United States
States and territories established in 1846
 
Contiguous United States